Nattawut Munsuwan (born 24 May 1998) is a Thai professional footballer who plays as a forward for Thai League 1 club Police Tero.

References

External links
 at Soccerway

1998 births
Living people
Nattawut Munsuwan
Nattawut Munsuwan
Nattawut Munsuwan
Nattawut Munsuwan
Association football forwards